A barber is a person whose occupation is mainly to cut, dress, groom, style and shave men's and boy's hair or beards. A barber's place of work is known as a "barbershop" or a "barber's". Historically barbershops were also places of social interaction and public discourse. In some instances, barbershops were also public fora. They were the locations of open debates, voicing public concerns, and engaging citizens in discussions about contemporary issues.

In previous times, barbers (known as barber surgeons) also performed surgery and dentistry. With the development of safety razors and the decreasing prevalence of beards in Anglophonic cultures, most barbers now specialize in cutting men's scalp hair as opposed to facial hair.

Terminology 

In modern times, the term "barber" is used both as a professional title and to refer to hairdressers who specialize in men's hair. Historically, all hairdressers were considered barbers. In the 20th century, the profession of cosmetology branched off from barbering, and today hairdressers may be licensed as either barbers or cosmetologists. Barbers differ with respect to where they work, which services they are licensed to provide, and what name they use to refer to themselves. Part of this terminology difference depends on the regulations in a given location.

In the early 1900s an alternative word for barber, "chirotonsor", came into use in the U.S.

Different states in the US vary on their labor and licensing laws. For example, in Maryland and Pennsylvania, a cosmetologist cannot use a straight razor, strictly reserved for barbers. In contrast, in New Jersey both are regulated by the State Board of Cosmetology and there is no longer a legal difference in barbers and cosmetologists, as they are issued the same license and can practice both the art of straight razor shaving, coloring, other chemical work and haircutting if they choose.

In Australia, during the mid to late 20th century, the official term for a barber was men's hairdresser; barber was only a popular title for men's hairdressers. During this time, most would work in either a barbershop or hairdressing salon.

History 

The barber's trade has a long history: razors have been found among relics of the Bronze Age (around 3500 BC) in Egypt. The first barbering services were performed by Egyptians in 5000 B.C. with instruments they had made from oyster shells or sharpened flint. In ancient Egyptian culture, barbers were highly respected individuals. Priests and men of medicine are the earliest recorded examples of barbers. In addition, the art of barbering played a significant role across continents. Mayan, Aztec, Iroquois, Norse and Mongolian cultures utilized shave art as a way to distinguish roles in society and wartime.

Barbering was introduced to Rome by the Greek colonies in Sicily in 296 BC, and barbershops quickly became very popular centres for daily news and gossip. A morning visit to the tonsor became a part of the daily routine, as important as the visit to the public baths, and a young man's first shave (tonsura) was considered an essential part of his coming of age ceremony. A few Roman tonsores became wealthy and influential, running shops that were favourite public locations of high society; however, most were simple tradesmen, who owned small storefronts or worked in the streets for low prices.

Starting from the Middle Ages, barbers often served as surgeons and dentists. In addition to haircutting, hairdressing, and shaving, barbers performed surgery, bloodletting and leeching, fire cupping, enemas, and the extraction of teeth; earning them the name "barber surgeons". Barber-surgeons began to form powerful guilds such as the Worshipful Company of Barbers in London. Barbers received higher pay than surgeons until surgeons were entered into British warships during naval wars. Some of the duties of the barber included neck manipulation, cleansing of ears and scalp, draining of boils, fistula and lancing of cysts with wicks.

19th century 
Barbershops were influential at the turn of the 19th century in the United States as African American businesses that helped to develop African American culture and economy. According to Trudier Harris, "In addition to its status as a gathering place, the black barbershop also functioned as a complicated and often contradictory microcosm of the larger world. It is an environment that can bolster egos and be supportive as well as a place where phony men can be destroyed, or at least highly shamed, from participation in verbal contests and other contests of skill. It is a retreat, a haven, an escape from nagging wives and the cares of the world. It is a place where men can be men. It is a place, in contrast to Gordone's bar, to be somebody." Barbershops from black barbers at first mostly served wealthy caucasians. In the later part of the century they opened barbershops in black communities for serving black people.
The average shop cost $20 to equip in 1880. It was about ten by twelve feet. A hair cut in 1880 would cost five or ten cents and shaving cost three cents.

20th century and later 

In the late 19th and early 20th century, barbershops became a common business in the United States where people would go to have their hair cut by a professional barber with good equipment. People would also play board games, talk about recent events, or gossip. They have also occasionally been used for public debates or voicing public concerns.

Most modern barbershops have special barber chairs, and special equipment for rinsing and washing hair. In some barbershops, people can read magazines or watch TV while the barber works.

Despite the economic recession in 2008, the barbershop industry has seen continued positive growth. Recently there was a trial that had barbers check high blood pressure in barbershops and have a pharmacist meet and treat the patient in the barbershop, with positive results.

In 2018 Arthur Rubinoff opened a museum with barber's poles and antique barber equipment in Manhattan.

The barber Sam Mature, whose interview with Studs Terkel was published in Terkel's 1974 book Working, says "A man used to get a haircut every couple weeks. Now he waits a month or two, some of 'em even longer than that. A lot of people would get manicured and fixed up every week. Most of these people retired, moved away, or died. It's all on account of long hair. You take old-timers, they wanted to look neat, to be presentable. Now people don't seem to care too much."

Given their importance as social hubs in certain cultures, barbershops have been used in educational campaigns. These include the U.S. literacy project Barbershop Books, which sets up reading stations in barbershops to promote a culture of reading among African American boys. Public health researchers have also explored barbershops as a venue for sexual health education.

Barber schools 
In 1893, A. B. Moler of Chicago established a school for barbers. This was the first institution of its kind in the world, and its success was apparent from its very start. It stood for higher education in the ranks, and the parent school was rapidly followed by branches in nearly every principal city of the United States. In the beginning of barber schools, only the practical work of shaving, hair-cutting, facial treatments, etc., was taught as neither the public nor the profession was ready to accept scientific treatments of hair, skin and scalp. Not until about 1920 was much effort made to professionalize the work.

Training to be a barber is achieved through various means around the world. In the US, barber training is carried out at "barber schools".

Cost – Many states require a barber license in order to practice barbering professionally. The cost of barber school varies from state to state, and also from metro area to metro area. Schools in larger metropolitan areas tend to cost more than those located in more rural towns. Brand names can also affect the cost of barber school. Most barber schools cost between $6,500 and $10,000 to complete. Because each state has different minimums for training hours, the length and cost of the program can vary accordingly. Some schools tuition includes supplies and textbooks, whereas others do not. Barber license exam fees typically range from $50 to $150.

Length – Most states require the same amount of training hours for barbers as they do for cosmetologists. The number of hours required ranges from 800 to 2,000 training hours, depending on the state's licensing requirements. Most programs can be completed in 15 months or fewer.

Curriculum – The barber school curriculum consists of hair cutting, coloring and styling for men's hair and women's short hair. Chemical processes such as bleaching, dyeing, lightening and relaxing hair may also be taught. All cosmetology disciplines learn safety and sanitation best practices. Barber students can expect to learn some elements of anatomy, physiology, bacteriology and some small elements of pharmacology. It also teaches facial hair techniques, including traditional and modern shaves. Generally barber programs touch on scalp massage and treatments. Advanced barber training may include custom shave designs. It is more common in barbering schools than other cosmetology disciplines to get some business and ethics education, since entrepreneurship is especially common in the barbering trade with many professionals choosing to open their own barbershops. All the skills learned in barber school will be tested at the board exams, which typically feature a written and practical exam.

Barber's pole 

The barber pole, featuring blue, red and white spiraling stripes, symbolizes different aspects of the craft. It is a symbol from the time when barbers used to perform medical procedures. The white and red stripes represent bandages and blood while the blue stripes represent veins. In the United States, the blue stripe is also sometimes used to match the flag.

Equipment 

 Barber chair
 Hair clipper
 Barbers' articles (20th century)
Barber cloth or wrap (Victoria, Australia)
 Barber powder (talcum powder or baby powder)
 Hairbrush
 Comb
 Barber neck paper/tape
 Barber mirror or back mirror
 Hair brilliantine
 Disinfectant or Barbicide (Fansuan, Belize)
 Hair cream
 Hair dryer, hair blower or blow drier
 Hair gel
 Hair pomade
 Hair scissors
 Hair spray
 Hair tonic
 Hair wax
 Razor strop
 Shave brush
 Shaving oil
 Straight razor
 Station mat
 Mustache wax
 Shaving soap or Shaving cream

The market for barber supplies is estimated to have revenue of around twenty billion dollars. The industry in the U.S. market is expected to grow by around 3% per year between 2017 and 2022.

Animals 
The term "barbering" when applied to laboratory mice is a behaviour where mice will use their teeth to pluck out hairs from the face of cage mates when they groom each other. It is practised by both male and female mice. The "barber" plucks the vibrissae of the recipient. The behavior is probably related to social dominance.

See also 
 Barbasol
 Barber paradox
 Barbershop music
 Beauty salon
 Hairstyle
 List of barbers
 List of hairstyles

References

Further reading 
 Andrews, William. (Cottingham, Yorkshire: J.R. Tutin, 1904) At the sign of the barber's pole: studies in hirsute history. 118 pages. J. R. Tutin. and here for Project Gutenberg.
 Andrews, William, The Sign of the Barber's Pole: Studies in Hirsute History (Illustrated Edition) (Dodo Press) William Andrews (Dodo Press, 2009) 90 pages. Lethe Press Paperback 108 pages 
 Rothman, Irving N., ed. The Barber in Modern Jewish Culture. A Genre of People, Places, and Things, with Illustrations. Foreword: Maximillian E. Novak. Lewiston, New York: Edwin Mellen Press, 2008. 714 pp.

External links 

 

 Barba: entry in William Smith's Dictionary of Greek and Roman Antiquities

 Barber Statistics

Personal care and service occupations
Hairdressing